Caspar Rudolph Ritter von Jhering (also Ihering) (22 August 1818 – 17 September 1892) was a German jurist. He is best known for his 1872 book Der Kampf ums Recht (The Struggle for Law), as a legal scholar, and as the founder of a modern sociological and historical school of law. His ideas were important to the subsequent development of the “jurisprudence of interests” in Germany.

Life and career
Jhering was born on 22 August 1818 in Aurich, in the Kingdom of Hanover. He entered the University of Heidelberg in 1836 and also studied in Göttingen, Munich, and starting 1838 in Berlin, where he earned his PhD. Of all his teacher, Georg Friedrich Puchta was the most influential one to him.

In 1844, after graduating as a doctor juris, Jhering established himself in Berlin as Privatdozent for Roman law, and delivered public lectures on the Geist des römischen Rechts (Spirit of Roman law), the theme that may be said to have constituted his life's work. In 1845, he became an ordinary professor at the University of Basel, in 1846 at Rostock, in 1849 at Kiel, and in 1851 at Giessen. He left his mark at each of those seats of learning; beyond any other of his contemporaries he animated the dry bones of Roman law.

In that period, the German juristic world was still under the dominating influence of Savigny. The older school looked askance at the young professor, who attempted to build up a system of jurisprudence based on natural justice. This is the keynote of his famous work, Geist des römischen Rechts auf den verschiedenen Stufen seiner Entwicklung (The spirit of Roman law at the various stages of its development, 1852–1865). Its originality and lucidity placed its author in the forefront of modern Roman jurists.

In the second half of the 19th century, Jhering's reputation was as high as that of Savigny's in the first half. Their methods were almost diametrically opposed. Savigny and his school represented an historical approach. Jhering's conception of jurisprudence was as a science to be utilized for the further advancement of the moral and social interests of mankind.

In 1868, Jhering accepted the chair of Roman Law at Vienna, where his lecture-room was not only crowded with regular students but men of all professions and even high-ranking officials. In 1872 Emperor Franz Joseph I of Austria conferred a title of hereditary nobility upon him.

The social functions of the Austrian metropolis became wearisome, and Jhering gladly exchanged it for the repose of Göttingen, where he became professor in 1872. That year, he had read a lecture in Vienna before an admiring audience, published under the title of Der Kampf um's Recht (1872; Eng. trans., The Struggle for Law, 1879). Its success was extraordinary. Within two years it attained twelve editions, and it has been translated into 26 languages. In this, his most famous work, Jhering based his theory of duty in the maintenance of one's rights, firstly, on the connection between rights and personality; and secondly, on the solidarity of law and rights. The relationship of rights to personality is explored. Our rights involve a parcel of our social worth, our honor. Whoever violates our rights, attacks our worth, our honor.

This work was followed five years later by Der Zweck im Recht (The Purpose in Law, 2 volumes, 1877–1883). These two works reflect Jhering's individuality. The Kampf ums Recht shows the firmness of his character, the strength of his sense of justice, and his juristic method and logic: every responsible person owes a duty to himself to assert his rights. The Zweck im Recht evidences the bent of the author's intellect. But perhaps the happiest combination of all his distinctive characteristics is to be found in his Jurisprudenz des täglichen Lebens (1870; Eng. trans., 1904). A great feature of his lectures was his so-called Praktika, problems in Roman law, and a collection of these with hints for solution was published as early as 1847 under the title Civilrechtsfalle ohne Entscheidungen.

Aside from shorter positions at Leipzig and Heidelberg, Jhering continued to work in Göttingen until his death on 17 September 1892.

His other works include the following: Beiträge zur Lehre vom Besitz, first published in the Jahrbücher für die Dogmatik des heutigen römischen und deutschen Privatrechts, and then separately; Der Besitzwille, and an article entitled Besitz in the Handwörterbuch der Staatswissenschaften (1891), which aroused much controversy at the time, particularly on account of the opposition manifested to Savigny's conception of the subject.

Jhering was married to Ida Christina Frölich. His oldest son was the German-Brazilian zoologist Hermann von Ihering (1850–1930). He was also the great-great-grandfather of Australian singer and actress Olivia Newton-John through his daughter Helene Ehrenberg and her marriage to the German jurist Victor Ehrenberg.

Jhering was elected a foreign member of the Royal Netherlands Academy of Arts and Sciences in 1874.

See also Scherz und Ernst in der Jurisprudenz (1885); Das Schuldmoment im römischen Privatrecht (1867); Das Trinkgeld (1882); and among the papers he left behind him his Vorgeschichte der Indoeuropaer, a fragment, was published by Victor Ehrenberg in 1894.

In October 2018 the bicentenary of Jhering was commemorated by scholars of Roman law from several countries.

Selected works
A bibliography of Jhering is provided by Tasia Walter. His main works include:

See also 
 Victor Ehrenberg (jurist)
 culpa in contrahendo

References

Bibliography

Further reading
 
 
 
 

1818 births
1892 deaths
People from Aurich
Austrian knights
Jurists from Lower Saxony
People from the Kingdom of Hanover
Heidelberg University alumni
Academic staff of Heidelberg University
University of Göttingen alumni
Academic staff of the University of Göttingen
Humboldt University of Berlin alumni
Academic staff of the University of Rostock
Academic staff of the University of Kiel
Academic staff of the University of Giessen
Academic staff of the University of Vienna
Academic staff of Leipzig University
Members of the Royal Netherlands Academy of Arts and Sciences